Marek Kincl (born 3 April 1973) is a Czech former footballer who played as a striker. He represented fourteen clubs in a career which began with Slavoj Vyšehrad in 1990 and concluded in 2010 after a stint at Bohemians (Střížkov) Prague, earning two caps for the Czech Republic national football team in 2000.

Career
After leaving FC Zenit St. Petersburg, Kincl signed for SK Rapid Wien, where he won the Austrian Bundesliga in his first season.

References

External links
 

1973 births
Living people
Czech footballers
Czech expatriate footballers
Czech Republic under-21 international footballers
Czech Republic international footballers
Czech First League players
Russian Premier League players
Austrian Football Bundesliga players
FC Hradec Králové players
FC Slovan Liberec players
FC Fastav Zlín players
Dukla Prague footballers
FK Viktoria Žižkov players
AC Sparta Prague players
FC Zenit Saint Petersburg players
SK Rapid Wien players
FK Chmel Blšany players
Expatriate footballers in Russia
Association football forwards
Expatriate footballers in Austria
Footballers from Prague